Aleksander Silverstov (also Aleksander Seliverstov; 1900 – December 1933 near Narva-Jõesuu) was an Estonian politician. He was a member of the V Riigikogu, representing the Left-wing Workers.

References

1900 births
1933 deaths
Left-wing Workers politicians
Members of the Riigikogu, 1932–1934